Russarö is an island south of Hanko. The island is closed to the public as it is military area of the Finnish Defence Forces. The island hosts the five-storey Russarö Lighthouse built in 1863 and a Finnish Meteorological Institute weather station.

December 1939
After a short exchange of fire, Stremitelny and Kirov were hit and the ships withdrew. Aboard the Kirov, 17 men were killed and 30 wounded.

References

External links 
 Helsingin Sanomat: Risteilyllä Russarön linnakkeeseen 

Hanko
Finnish islands in the Baltic
Islands of Uusimaa